Almuth Schult (born 9 February 1991) is a German footballer who plays as a goalkeeper the Germany national team and is currently a free agent.

Club career
At the age of five, Schult began her career at her local football club FC SG Gartow, before moving to Hamburger SV in 2007. She joined Magdeburger FFC in 2008, where she played in the third-tier Regionalliga. At Magdeburg Schult became a regular starter and achieved promotion with her team to the 2. Frauen-Bundesliga, where she played two full seasons. In 2011, Schult signed a three-year contract with Frauen-Bundesliga side SC 07 Bad Neuenahr. In 2013, she signed a two-year contract with Bundesliga and UEFA Women's Champions League champions VfL Wolfsburg.

International career
Schult reached third-place with Germany at the 2008 FIFA U-17 Women's World Cup, appearing in two matches. Two years later, she was Germany's first choice goalkeeper at the 2010 U-20 Women's World Cup, which the team won. The tournament was played on home soil in Germany. Schult was called up as third goalkeeper for Germany's 2011 Women's World Cup squad. Her first team debut was on 15 February 2012 against Turkey.

After the retirement of Nadine Angerer, Schult's first major tournament as the starting goalkeeper for Germany came at the 2016 Summer Olympics, where she played every minute and earned Germany their first ever gold medal in women's Olympic football.

Honours
VfL Wolfsburg
Bundesliga: 2013–14, 2016–17, 2017–18, 2018–19
DFB-Pokal: 2014–15, 2015–16, 2016–17, 2017–18, 2018–19
UEFA Women's Champions League: 2014

Germany
UEFA European Women's Championship: 2013, runner-up: 2022
Summer Olympic Games: Gold medal, 2016
Algarve Cup: 2012, 2014

Germany U20
FIFA U-20 Women's World Cup: 2010

Germany U17
FIFA U-17 Women's World Cup: third place 2008

Individual
IFFHS World's Best Woman Goalkeeper: 2014
IFFHS World's Best Woman Goalkeeper of the Decade 2011–2020

References

External links
 Profile at DFB 
 Player German domestic football stats at DFB 
 
 
 
 
 

1991 births
Living people
People from Lüchow-Dannenberg
German women's footballers
German expatriate women's footballers
Footballers from Lower Saxony
Women's association football goalkeepers
Germany women's international footballers
Olympic footballers of Germany
Footballers at the 2016 Summer Olympics
Olympic gold medalists for Germany
Medalists at the 2016 Summer Olympics
Olympic medalists in football
2011 FIFA Women's World Cup players
2015 FIFA Women's World Cup players
2019 FIFA Women's World Cup players
UEFA Women's Euro 2022 players
UEFA Women's Championship-winning players
Frauen-Bundesliga players
SC 07 Bad Neuenahr players
VfL Wolfsburg (women) players
Hamburger SV (women) players
Angel City FC players
German expatriate sportspeople in the United States
Expatriate women's soccer players in the United States
UEFA Women's Euro 2017 players
National Women's Soccer League players